Camponotus buddhae is a species of carpenter ant (genus Camponotus) found in India, Iran, Kyrgyzstan, Russia, Turkey, and Turkmenistan.

References

buddhae
Hymenoptera of Asia
Insects described in 1892